Der Golem is an opera in three acts by composer Eugen d'Albert. The work uses a German language libretto by Ferdinand Lion after Arthur Holitscher's 1908 play Der Golem: Ghettolengende in drei Aufzügen. The opera premiered on 14 November 1926 at the Oper Frankfurt, conducted by Clemens Krauss.

Roles

Recordings
In 2010 the German company Musikproduktion Dabringhaus und Grimm (MDG) released a live recording made early 2010, with  conducting the Beethoven Orchester Bonn.

References

External links

Operas by Eugen d'Albert
1926 operas
German-language operas
Operas based on plays
Operas set in the 16th century
Golem
Operas